Bathydexia is a genus of bristle flies in the family Tachinidae.

Species
Bathydexia albolineata Wulp, 1891
Bathydexia wulpii Townsend, 1931

References

External links

 
 

Dexiinae
Taxa named by Frederik Maurits van der Wulp
Diptera of North America
Tachinidae genera